Health and Quality of Life Outcomes is a peer-reviewed online-only open access medical journal covering research on health-related quality of life. It was established in 2003 and is published by BioMed Central. The editor-in-chief is Holger Schünemann (McMaster University). According to the Journal Citation Reports, the journal has a 2017 impact factor of 2.278.

References

External links

BayArt Website

BioMed Central academic journals
Publications established in 2003
Quality of life
General medical journals
Online-only journals
English-language journals
Irregular journals